Gustavo Omar Trujillo Corona (9 November 1977 – 1 December 2022) was a Mexican professional footballer who played as a defender. He spent most of his career with Monarcas Morelia.

Club career
At the club level, Trujillo played for Tigres in the Primera División de México. Since Darío Franco retired in 2004, he has assumed the role of team captain. He, in turn, was replaced in that capacity by Mauricio Martín Romero during the 2009 Clausura season.

International career
Trujillo earned his first and only cap for the Mexico national team on 27 April 2005, in a match against Poland.

Honours
Morelia
 Primera División de México: Invierno 2000

References

External links

1977 births
2022 deaths
Sportspeople from Morelia
Footballers from Michoacán
Mexican footballers
Association football defenders
Mexico international footballers
Liga MX players
Ascenso MX players
Atlético Morelia players
Atlas F.C. footballers
Tigres UANL footballers
20th-century Mexican people